Alisher Seitov (born 5 May 1979) is a Kazakhstani diver. He competed in the men's 3 metre springboard event at the 2000 Summer Olympics.

References

1979 births
Living people
Kazakhstani male divers
Olympic divers of Kazakhstan
Divers at the 2000 Summer Olympics
Sportspeople from Almaty